Jim Sprott may refer to:

 Jim Sprott (scientist), scientist involved in forensic work regarding the murder of Harvey and Jeannette Crewe
 Jim Sprott (ice hockey) (born 1969), Canadian  ice hockey defenceman